The Mazhilis of the Parliament of the Republic of Kazakhstan of the 3rd convocation was the legislative term of the lower house of the Parliament of Kazakhstan. It lasted from 3 November 2004 until the dissolution of the Parliament on 20 June 2007. During the convocation, the Otan gained its largest share of the seats after it became merged with Asar, Civic, and Agrarian parties in 2006.

The 3rd Mazhilis was formed after the 2004 Kazakh legislative election which took place in September and October 2004. The seats were elected through mixed electoral system before the 2007 amendment to the Constitution of Kazakhstan which replaced the voting system with proportional representation.

Structure

References 

Convocations of the Mazhilis